The 1994 Metro Conference men's basketball tournament was held March 11–13 at the Mississippi Coast Coliseum in Biloxi, Mississippi. 

Louisville defeated  in the championship game, 69–61, to win their 10th Metro men's basketball tournament. The Cardinals received an automatic bid to the 1994 NCAA Tournament as the conference's lone representative.

Format
All seven of the conference's members participated. They were seeded based on regular season conference records, with the top team earning a bye into the semifinal round. The other six teams entered into the preliminary first round.

Bracket

References

Metro Conference men's basketball tournament
Tournament
Metro Conference men's basketball tournament
Metro Conference men's basketball tournament